The Caves of Gargas in the Pyrenees region of France are known for their cave art from the Upper Paleolithic period - about 27,000 years old.

The caves are open to the public.

Location
The caves are located near the town of Aventignan in the Hautes-Pyrénées department in south-western France, at the edge of the Haute-Garonne close to Saint-Bertrand-de-Comminges.

History

Human occupation
The caves have yielded evidence of occupation (bones, lithics (stone tools) and portable art) from the Mousterian to the Middle Ages, but it is most famous for its paintings and engravings of the Upper Paleolithic.

The paintings have numerous negative hand stencils made by the stencil technique. The hands are red (ochre) or black (manganese oxide), using a mixture of iron oxide and manganese crushed with animal fat, and sprayed around the hand against the wall. Some have one or more fingers absent which leads to hypotheses of diseases, frostbite and ritual amputation, but most researchers prefer the symbolism of bending one or more fingers.

Many figurative engravings are also present in other parts of the caves, depicting horses, bison, aurochs, ibex and mammoth. Carbon-14 dating of a bone stuck in a crack in a wall decorated with hand stencils revealed close to 27,000 years BP, indicating that the cave was frequented in the Gravettian period. It is surmised that the Hands paintings probably date from this period.

Discovery
The two chambers of the caves began to be scientifically explored and documented at the end of the 19th century by Émile Cartailhac and Abbé Henri Breuil, but it was Felix Regnault who discovered the hand-print images in 1906.

Tourism
The caves have been classified since 1910 by the French Ministry of Culture as a monument historique (historic monument), Schedule 2, and are open to the public.

See also

 Prehistoric art
 List of archaeological sites by country
 List of caves
 Cave painting

References

Bibliography
 Foucher Pascal, San Juan-Foucher Cristina, Rumeau Yoan, La grotte de Gargas. Un siècle de découvertes, Édition Communautés de Communes du Canton de Saint-Laurent-de-Neste, 2007, 128 pages.

19th-century archaeological discoveries
Caves of Occitania (administrative region)
Caves containing pictograms in France
Stone Age sites in France
Monuments historiques of Occitania (administrative region)
World Heritage Sites in France
Mousterian